Haribo is a German confectionery company founded by Hans Riegel Sr.. It began in Kessenich, Bonn, Germany. The name "Haribo" is a syllabic abbreviation formed from Hans Riegel Bonn. The company created the first gummy candy in 1960 in the form of little gummy bears called Gummibärchen. The current headquarters are in Grafschaft, Germany.

History

On December 13, 1920, the company was registered in the commercial register by its founder Johannes Riegel. In 1921, his wife Gertrud Riegel was the company's first employee. According to the company, Riegel's seed capital was a sack of sugar, a copper pot, a marble slab, a stool, a stonewalled stove and a roller. In the same year, he bought a house that was located in the Bonn district Kessenich on a street called Bergstraße. The house was Haribo's first production facility. Two years after the company foundation, Hans Riegel invented the precursor of the Goldbear, who was still called Tanzbär (Dancing Bear) at that time. However, it was not only bigger than the present gummy bears, but also softer, due to the use of gum arabic instead of the now common gelatine.

Haribo since expanded its operations, taking over many local confectionery manufacturers in countries all over the world. It began international expansion in the 1960s and entered American markets in the 1980s. As of 2013, it operated 16 factories which produce over 100 million gummy bears per day.

In 1986, the confectionery company Haribo from Bonn bought the production and rights to the Maoam candy.

Goldbears 
Goldbears are fruit gums in the shape of stylised bears, that are two centimetres in size and consist of sugar, sugar syrup, colourants and flavourings. They also contain acidifiers, coating agents, water and a gelatine mixture, which gives the bears their rubbery consistency. Since 1960,  Haribo calls its gummy bears Goldbears, in order to distinguish them from other manufacturers' products. In 2005, Haribo produced about 100 million Goldbears daily in 15 establishments throughout Europe to ensure the distribution in over 100 countries. The Goldbears account for Haribo's largest revenue share. According to the company, their brand awareness in Germany is 99 percent and the Goldbear stands for childlike joy.

For the German market, they are coloured with natural fruit extracts, in contrast to the use of colourants in the past. Although there are enough possibilities today to create a shade of blue, making the production of blue Goldbears theoretically conceivable, the Haribo management does not want to make any changes to the traditional product.

In August 2007, the product range was partly changed by adding apple as a new flavour and giving it the colour green. The strawberry flavour, which was hitherto assigned to the colour green, was recoloured to light red. Additionally, the shape of the Goldbears was slightly changed, compared to the former generations, by giving them a smiling face.

Devoted to the UEFA Euro in 2008, Haribo produced Schwarz-Rot-Goldbären: a black, red and yellow Goldbear mix. The mix, which was inspired by the colour combination of the German flag, contained the flavours blackcurrant (black), raspberry (red) and lemon (yellow). For the first time ever, Haribo developed black Goldbears, which, besides blackcurrant, also contained elder extract.

On the occasion of the FIFA World Cup in 2014, Haribo produced the Goldbären-Fan-Edition. This mix included gummy bears in cherry (dark red), grapefruit (red), watermelon (green), woodruff (dark green) and apricot (orange) flavour as well as blue Goldbears in blueberry flavour.

UK presence

Haribo entered the UK sweets market by buying Dunhill's in 1992, a manufacturer of liquorice Pontefract cakes which was founded in the 18th century.

Haribo's key brands in the UK are Starmix, Tangfastics, Supermix, and Maoam, with Maoam being a brand of chewy sweets being bought in 1986 from Edmund Münster, the  manufacturer who originally owned Maoam when it was first launched in Germany back in 1931. They were once the distributor of Pez products in the United Kingdom, but this is no longer the case. Haribo makes Pontefract Cakes at their factory in Pontefract, West Yorkshire, and other locations. The company owns seven shops in the UK located in Pontefract, West Midlands, York, Cheshire, East Midlands, Somerset and Kent.

US presence

Haribo had been imported into the United States since 1982. In Germany, Haribo was not an exclusive gourmet product, but a mere candy. When Haribo of America was incorporated in the 1980s in Baltimore, Maryland, Haribo's gummy candies were introduced to the US mass market through retailers such as drugstores, grocery stores, and discount stores. The packaging was translated into English, and package weights were adjusted to match U.S. candy price points and package sizes. A laydown bag was developed for the US supermarket trade, instead of the hanging bag commonly found in German supermarkets, and a boxed product was developed for theaters.

Sales soared the first year, and gummy bears became so popular in the US that Haribo could not supply enough products, so the US market was soon flooded with competitors such as German Trolli and American Black Forest.

On 23 March 2017, Haribo announced the opening of its first United States factory, a 500,000 sq ft (46,500 m2), 400 employee manufacturing plant in Kenosha County, Wisconsin, scheduled to start construction in 2020 by Gilbane Building Company.

International distribution

Haribo plans to expand to China and Brazil. In China, it has launched test stores in Shanghai and in Guangdong province. The US headquarters is located in Rosemont, IL. New production facilities opened in Castleford, West Yorkshire, in 2016, and it plans to open in São Paulo, Brazil.

Slogans

Haribo's German catchphrase is "Haribo macht Kinder froh – und Erwachsene ebenso" ("Haribo makes children happy – and adults as well"). The German advertisements starred Thomas Gottschalk from 1991 until 2015. In English-speaking countries, it uses the slogan "Kids and grown-ups love it so – the happy world of Haribo". In Hungary, it uses the slogan "Gyermek, felnőtt kedve jó – édes élet, Haribo" ("Child and adult is happy – sweet life, Haribo"). "Haribo c'est beau la vie, pour les grands et les petits" ("Haribo life is beautiful, for big ones and little ones") is used in France, while in Italy the song used during commercials is: "Haribo è la bontà, che si gusta ad ogni età" ("Haribo is the delicacy that one can taste at any age").  In Turkey, it uses the slogan "Çocuk ya da büyük ol, Haribo'yla mutlu ol" ("Be a kid or a grown up, be happy with Haribo"). In Denmark, it uses the slogan "Luk op for noget godt! Luk op for Haribo! Den er go'" ("Open for something good! Open for Haribo! It is good"). Similar slogans are used in other languages. The Haribo jingle music was created by UK composer Stephen Lee Vickers.

References

External links

 
list of all haribo outlets in germany https://www.mein-outlet.com/fabrikverkauf/haribo-werksverkauf/

Food and drink companies established in 1920
Candy
Food and drink companies of Germany
Brand name confectionery
German brands
Companies based in Bonn
Companies based in Rhineland-Palatinate
Ahrweiler (district)
German confectionery
Gummi candies
1920 establishments in Germany
German snack foods
Desserts
Confectionery companies